The Sociedad Económica de los Amigos del País de la Habana or Real Sociedad Patriótica de la Habana (est. 1792 or 1793) is a learned society in Havana, Cuba. It was initially organized to promote agriculture, commerce, education, and industry, modelled on the Sociedad Económica de los Amigos del País in Spain. Founding members included Diego de la Barrera, Francisco Joseph Basabe, Luis de Las Casas, Juan Manuel O'Farrill, Tomás Romay y Luis Peñalver, and Antonio Robledo. In its early decades the group produced publications, maintained a library in the Convento de Santo Domingo (1800-1844), and arranged educational programs. Around the 1790s the group built the Hospicio o Casa de Beneficencia in Havana.

Variant names
The society has renamed itself several times, as follows:
 Real Junta de Fomento y Real Sociedad Económica (1858-1863)
 Real Junta de Fomento y Real Sociedad Económica de la Habana (1853-1857)
 Real Junta de Fomento y Sociedad Económica de la Habana (1851-1853)
 Real Sociedad Económica (1864-1866)
 Real Sociedad Económica de Amigos del País de la Habana (1877-1896)
 Real Sociedad Económica de la Habana (1817-1823; 1846-1849)
 Real Sociedad Patriótica de la Habana (1835-1838)
 Reales Junta de Fomento y Sociedad Económica de la Habana (1849-1850)
 Sociedad Económica de la Habana (1824-1825; 1843-1845)
 Sociedad Patriótica de la Havana (1793-1795; 1838-1843)

References

This article incorporates information from the Spanish Wikipedia.

Bibliography

Issued by the society
  1793-
  1790-1804. (fulltext issues via Biblioteca Nacional de España, Digital Newspaper Archive)
  1805-1809. (issues)
  1810-1846

About the society
 
 
  (Thesis)
 
 
  (fulltext)

External links
 

1793 establishments in Cuba
Organizations established in 1793
Organizations based in Havana
Learned societies of Cuba